James Waldegrave, 1st Earl Waldegrave,  (168411 April 1741) was a British diplomat who served as ambassador to Austria and France.

Life
Waldegrave was the son of the 1st Baron Waldegrave and Henrietta FitzJames, the illegitimate daughter of James II and Arabella Churchill.

Educated in France, Waldegrave inherited his father's title in 1690, and, on 20 May 1714, he married Mary Webb (who died in childbirth in 1719), a daughter of Sir John Webb, 3rd Baronet and they had three surviving children:

James Waldegrave, 2nd Earl Waldegrave (1715–1763)
John Waldegrave, 3rd Earl Waldegrave (1718–1784)
Lady Henrietta Waldegrave (1717–1753), married firstly, Lord Edward Herbert, a son of the 2nd Marquess of Powis and had issue; married secondly, John Beard (a singer at Covent Garden).

After the death of his wife, he converted from Roman Catholicism (the religion he was brought up in) to Anglicanism to take his seat in the House of Lords. He was briefly a Lord of the Bedchamber in 1723 and again from 1730 to 1741. He was ambassador extraordinary to France in 1725 and Ambassador to Austria from 1727 to 1730. He then succeeded Horatio Walpole as ambassador to France from 1730 to 1740. 

During his ambassadorship to France, he still spent enough time in London to be one of the founding Governors of the new charity there, known as the Foundling Hospital (created in 1739). In 1729, he had been created Earl Waldegrave and on his death in 1741, was succeeded by his eldest son, James.

Sir James inherited Hever Castle in Kent which had remained in the Waldegrave family for 160 years.  It was deemed too small for Sir James and he sold it in the early 1700s to Sir William Humfreys, Lord Mayor of London (1714).

Ancestry

References

External links

1684 births
1741 deaths
People from Mendip District
People from Somerset
Earls Waldegrave
Knights of the Garter
Converts to Anglicanism from Roman Catholicism
Members of the Privy Council of Great Britain
James Waldegrave, 1st Earl Waldegrave
Diplomatic peers
Ambassadors of Great Britain to France
Freemasons of the Premier Grand Lodge of England
Ambassadors of Great Britain to the Holy Roman Emperor
Montesquieu